Colin Graham (1931–2007) was a stage director of opera, theatre, and television

Colin Graham may also refer to:

Colin Graham (footballer, born 1915) (1915–2000), Australian footballer for Geelong
Colin Graham (footballer, born 1958), Australian footballer for Melbourne
Colin Graham (English cricketer) (born 1957), English cricketer
Colin Graham (New Zealand cricketer) (1929–2020), New Zealand cricketer